The Japanese Hospital or Saipan Byoin is a historic World War II-era hospital complex on Route 3 in Garapan, a village on the island of Saipan in the Northern Mariana Islands.  The three concrete buildings are the largest Japanese-built structures to survive the war.  The main hospital building is an L-shaped structure with a domed entrance at the crook of the L.  A second, smaller building housed the pharmacy, while the third is an underground circular chamber of unknown purpose.  All were in deteriorating condition when surveyed in the early 1970s.  The complex has since undergone restoration, and the main hospital building now houses the Northern Mariana Islands Museum.

The hospital was listed on National Register of Historic Places in 1974.

See also
Japanese Hospital (Rota), also NRHP-listed in the Northern Mariana Islands
National Register of Historic Places listings in the Northern Mariana Islands

References

Buildings and structures on the National Register of Historic Places in the Northern Mariana Islands
World War II on the National Register of Historic Places in the Northern Mariana Islands
Buildings and structures in Saipan
Garapan
Health in the Northern Mariana Islands
Hospital buildings on the National Register of Historic Places